The first generation of trams in Luxembourg ran from 1875 to 1964, before being withdrawn from service and the tramways removed. A second generation of trams began operational service on 10 December 2017, along a new route that will, by the end of 2024, run from Luxembourg Airport to the Cloche d'Or business district, in Gasperich, serving the new national stadium, via Pfaffenthal-Kirchberg and Luxembourg railway stations. Additional lines are planned for the network both within Luxembourg City, as well as extending to Strassen and Esch-sur-Alzette.

Contemporary and future usage

T1

Luxembourg is in the process of reintroducing trams to its transport infrastructure. Construction work begun on a new tram depot on the edge of the Grünewald Forest and the Kirchberg quarter of Luxembourg City in January 2015, with the first tracks of the T1 tramline being laid in July 2016. The tramline, when fully operational, will have 24 stations connected by 16 km of tracks and have a capacity of 10,000 passengers per hour in each direction. Trams provided by the Spanish company CAF began trials on the first phase of the route in July 2017.

On 10 December 2017, the first phase of the route opened with trams running from the depot, along Avenue John F. Kennedy, past the European district, the location of many EU institutions, before terminating at the Grand Duchess Charlotte Bridge. Here, a new funicular railway was opened on the same date allowing passengers to descend to Pfaffenthal-Kirchberg railway station for access to national and international heavy rail services running through the Pfaffenthal valley. 

The second phase opened on 27 July 2018; it extended tram services across the Grand Duchess Charlotte Bridge to Place de l'Étoile in the Limpertsberg quarter.

Opening on 13 December 2020, the third phase saw the line extend into the historical Ville Haute quarter, across the Adolphe Bridge, along the Avenue de la Liberté, before terminating at Luxembourg railway station for interchanges between national and international heavy rail services. Work to widen and re-enforce the Adolphe Bridge, first opened in 1903, to accommodate the tramway was completed in July 2017, with a new cycle and pedestrian lane suspended beneath the existing bridge.

In operation as of 11 September 2022, the fourth phase extended the line from the central station to Bonnevoie. 

The fitfh phase of the route, will, by Spring 2024, extend southwestwards from Bonnevoie, via the new Howald station to the new business district in Cloche d'Or, Gasperich, before terminating at Luxembourg's new national stadium.

The final phase of the route, to be completed by the end of 2024, will extend the line eastwards from the tram depot on the edge of Kirchberg to Senningerberg before terminating at Luxembourg Airport.

Future lines

In October 2020, the Minister for Sustainable Development and Infrastructure, François Bausch, presented detailed plans, of an initiative first announced in June 2018, for a future tramline, extending off the T1 line, alongside the A4 motorway to the north of Luxembourg's second most populous city, Esch-sur-Alzette, by 2028, and to the Belval quarter of the city, including the University of Luxembourg Belval campus, by 2035. Trams would be expected to reach speeds of up to 100 km/h when travelling through rural sections of the route. In conjunction, plans were announced to expand the network, with the creation of additional lines connected to T1 within, and in proximity to, Luxembourg City, serving amongst other areas, the planned Laangfur residential district in Kirchberg, via Boulevard Konrad Adenauer, as well as, via a revamped Place de l'Étoile interchange and Route d'Arlon, Strassen.

Rolling stock 
Twenty-one CAF Urbos trams were delivered in 2017, with a further twelve ordered in 2018.

Historical usage and museum

Luxembourg's first horse-drawn tram line began operations in 1875 running through Luxembourg City along a 10 km line.  Electrification followed in 1908. The original track followed a route from Luxembourg railway station through the city centre to Limpertsberg. It was extended to various parts of the city until 1930 when the network covered 31 km. Several lines were closed at the beginning of the 1960s as buses replaced the trams. The last tram ran on the line to Beggen on 5 September 1964. The country's other tram network designated Tramways Intercommunaux du Canton d'Esch served Esch-sur-Alzette and its surroundings from 1927 to 1956.

A number of historic trams can be seen at Luxembourg City's tram and bus museum located on Rue de Bouillon in Hollerich. In particular, the museum exhibits two electric trams, two tram coaches, and a replica of a horse tram. There are also numerous models and photographs.

Further reading
 Association des modélistes ferroviaires de Luxembourg (Walferdange): Les tramways de la ville de Luxembourg: T.V.L., Walferdange : A.M.F.L., 1986, 156p., Collection: Les chemins de fer luxembourgeois, Vol. 5.
 Bohnert, Paul; Dhur, Raymond; Eck, Jules; Rauen, Prosper: De Minettstram: die Geschichte der interkommunalen Trambahnen im Kanton Esch, Düdelingen : Stadtverwaltung und Kulturkommission, 1985, 325p.
 Hoffmann Jean-Paul, Dhur Raymond, Clesse René, Balthasar Marcel: Tramway Municipaux - De Stater Tram: die Geschichte des öffentlichen Personen-Nahverkehrs in der Stadt Luxemburg 1875-1993, Administration municipale, 1993, 259p.

See also

Transport in Luxembourg
History of rail transport in Luxembourg
Trams
Trams in Europe

References

External links
 luxtram.lu
 tram and funicular at public-transport.net

Passenger rail transport in Luxembourg
Tram transport